From Branch to Branch is the fourth studio album by Leon Redbone, released in 1981. It was his first on Atlantic Records and peaked at No. 152 on the ''Billboard 200 chart.

Track listing 

Side One
 "(Mama's Got a Baby Named) Te Na Na" (Leon Redbone) – 2:58
 "A Hot Time in the Old Town Tonight" (Theodore August Metz, Joe Hayden, Redbone) – 3:00
 "Sweet Mama (Papa's Getting Mad)" (Peter Frost, George Little, Fred Rose) – 2:42
 "Step It Up and Go" (Rudy Ray Moore, Redbone) – 3:40
 "Your Cheatin' Heart" (Hank Williams) – 3:02
 "Seduced" (Gary Tigerman) – 2:40

Side Two
 "Why" (Jelly Roll Morton, Ed Werac) – 4:42
 "My Blue Heaven" (Walter Donaldson, George A. Whiting) – 2:21
 "Extra Blues" (Redbone) – 4:03
 "When You Wish Upon a Star" (Leigh Harline, Ned Washington) – 2:01
 "Prairie Lullaby" (Mary Rogers) – 3:30

Personnel
Leon Redbone – vocals, guitar
Dr. John – piano, drums, hambone
Mitch Holder – guitar
Ralph Humphrey – drums
Tim May – banjo
Grady Tate – drums
Terry Waldo – drums
Michael Braun – drums
Bob Cranshaw – bass, vibraphone
Jonathan Dorn – tuba
Tom Artin – trombone
Vince Giordano – bass saxophone
Bobby Gordon – clarinet, saxophone
Jack Maheu – clarinet
Victor Morosco – clarinet
Robert Payne – trombone
Ed Polcer – trumpet
Jim Rothermel – clarinet, saxophone
Jim Self – tuba
Dick Halligan – arranger
William S. Fischer – string arrangements
Production notes
Beryl Handler – producer
Joel Dorn – producer
Ed Sprigg – engineer
Vince McGarry – engineer
Michael O'Reilly – assistant engineer
Tom Heid – assistant engineer
Sandi Young – art direction

References

Leon Redbone albums
1981 albums
Albums produced by Joel Dorn
Atlantic Records albums